K152 or K-152 may refer to :
 K-152 (Kansas highway), a Kansas highway numbered 152
 , a 1940 Canadian Navy 
 Russian submarine K-152 Nerpa, a 2008 Project 971 Shchuka-B type nuclear-powered attack submarine